The Flora of the Australian Capital Territory are the plants that grow naturally in the Australian Capital Territory (ACT). The environments range from Alpine area on the higher mountains, sclerophyll forest, to woodland. Much of the ACT has been cleared for grazing, and is also burnt off by bushfires several times per century. The kinds of plants can be grouped into vascular plants that include gymnosperms, flowering plants, and ferns; bryophytes, lichens, fungi, and freshwater algae. Four flowering plants are endemic to the ACT. Also several lichens are unique to the ACT, however as further study is undertaken they are likely to be found elsewhere too.

Most plants in the ACT are characteristic of the Flora of Australia and include well known plants such as Grevillea, Eucalyptus trees and kangaroo grass.

Vegetation habitats
Grassland originally occurred on the low plains around north Canberra, Woolshed creek in Majura, Jerrabomberra Creek in Symonston, Gerrabomberra Creek in Belconnen, Tuggeranong Creek in Isabella Plains and Yarralumla Creek in Woden Valley. Almost all of these areas have been built over by suburbs, or modified by farming. The main plants from the grasslands were Stipa, Danthonia and Themeda (spear grass, wallaby grass and kangaroo grass). Trees do 
not exists on the grasslands due to the frost hollow effect where cold heavy air sinks on frosty mornings killing off larger vegetation. The remains of the grasslands are now full of introduced weeds and grasses. A small reserve of remnant grasslands is found at Yarramundi on the north side of Lake Burley Griffin.

Most of the trees in the ACT are Eucalyptus species.

Low altitude woodland is dominated by Eucalyptus melliodora (yellow box) and Eucalyptus polyanthemos (red box). E. blakelyi is found in lower lying areas. E. bridgesiana grows along creeks. In sandy soil near rivers Casuarina cunninghamiana is common. On the border between woodland and grassland Eucalyptus pauciflora (snow gum) and Eucalyptus rubida are the only trees growing. These trees can survive lower temperatures.

High altitude woodland occupies the floor of the higher valleys in the south of the ACT. The trees are dominated by E. stellulata (black sally) and snowgums.

On the ground above the woodland there is dry sclerophyll forest. The trees in this are Eucalyptus dives (broad leaved peppermint), E. mannifera var maculosa (red spotted gum), the scribbly gum (Eucalyptus rossii) and red stringy gum (Eucalyptus macrorhyncha). Mount Majura, Mount Ainslie, Bullen Range, and Black Mountain are covered in this kind of forest. Dry sclerophyll forest also grows on the north and west side of hills, below 660 metres, which is warmer and drier. Gulleys in this kind of forest can contain Eucalyptus viminalis (manna gum) and Eucalyptus radiata var. robertsonii (narrow leaved peppermint).

Wet sclerophyll forest is found growing on the western mountainous parts of the ACT where rain fall is higher and the ground is more elevated. E. fastigata (brown barrel) and Eucalyptus delegatensis (alpine ash) dominate the forest. Dense shrubs up to five metres high form an understorey. Examples of these are Leptospermum lanigerum, Pomaderris aspera, Olearia argophylla, and Bedfordia salicina. The top side of this forest has Eucalyptus dalrympleana and E. pauciflora starting to take over.

Alpine woodland is found in the highest levels of the ACT with E. pauciflora the dominant tree. This grows either thinly or in clumps, with the intervening ground feature Poa species.

Vascular plants found only in the ACT

Pomaderris pallida family Rhamnaceae. Found along Murrumbidgee, Cotter, Paddys and Molonglo Rivers. A round bush 1 to 2 metres high, creamish coloured flowers.

Arachnorchis actensis (Canberra spider-orchid).

Lepidium ginninderrense (Ginninderra peppercress). Found in the Northwest corner of the Belconnen Naval Transmission Station at Lawson

Muehlenbeckia tuggeranong (Tuggeranong lignum). The plant takes the form of a mound of tangled stems 1 m high and 2 m across. Found near Pine Island on the Murrumbidgee River but is extremely rare.

Corunastylis ectopa (Brindabella midge-orchid, ectopic midge-orchid).

Gymnosperms
Only two species of gymnosperms are native to the ACT. These are a shrub called Podocarpus lawrencei (mountain plum pine) and a small tree Callitris endlicheri (black cypress pine). The cypress grows in steep stony soil in places such as Molonglo Gorge, Murrumbidgee River valley and Ginninderra Gorge.

Other gymnosperms are cultivated in the ACT such as Pinus radiata.

Government managed trees in the ACT

In the ACT, the government manages over 760,000 trees on public urban land as well as trees on leased land.

There are 210 tree species that have been approved by the ACT government for landscape projects. The trees include native trees, exotic trees and conifers:

Acacia caerulescens
Acacia covenyi
Acacia melanoxylon
Acacia pendula
Acer andrachne
Acer buergerianum
Acer griseum
Acer grosseri var. hersii
Acer plantanoides Crimson King
Acer platanoides
Acer japonicum Vitifolium
Acer japonicum
Acer palmatum Trompenburg
Acer plantanoides Crimson Sentry
Acer rubrum October Glory
Acer × freemanii Jeffersred Autumn Blaze
Allocasuarina glauca
Allocasuarina littoralis
Allocasuarina verticillata
Angophora floribunda
Arbutus manziesii
Arbutus unedo
Arbutus × andrachnoides
Betula pendula Laciniata
Betula pendula
Brachychiton populneus
Callistemon citrinus
Callitris endlicheri
Callitris glaucophylla
Callistemon harkness
Callistemon kings park
Callistemon viminalis
Callistemon muelleri
Catalpa bignonioides
Cedrus atlantica Glauca
Cedrus deodara
Cedrus libani
Crataegus Smithiana
Cupressus arizonica
Cupressus cashmeriana
Cupressus sempervirenus Glauca
Cupressus sempervirens Glauca
Cupressus sempervirens Stricta
Cupressus sempervirens Swanes Golden
Cupressus torulosa
Davidia involucrata
Eucalyptus aggregata
Eucalyptus apiculata
Eucalyptus cinerea
Eucalyptus cunninghamii
Eucalyptus dealbata
Eucalyptus dives
Eucalyptus gracilis
Eucalyptus leucoxylon
Eucalyptus lacrimans
Eucalyptus mannifera
Eucalyptus michaelinana
Eucalyptus mitchelliana
Eucalyptus moorei
Eucalyptus nortonii
Eucalyptus parvula
Eucalyptus pauciflora
Eucalyptus scoparia
Eucalyptus stellulata
Fagus sylvatica Purpurea
Fraxinus americana
Fraxinus angustifolia subsp. oxycarpa Raywood
Fraxinus excelsior Aurea
Fraxinus excelsior Westhofs Glorie
Fraxinus ornus
Fraxinus pennsylvanica Cimmzam Cimmarson
Fraxinus pennsylvanica Urbdell Urbanite
Fraxinus pennsylvanica Wasky Skyward
Fraxinus velutina
Ginkgo biloba
Gleditsia triacanthos
Larix decidua
Liquidambar styraciflua festeri
Liquidambar styraciflua
Melaleuca bracteata
Melia azedarach caroline
Melia azedarach elite
Pinus brutia
Pinus canariensis
Pinus eldarica
Pinus halepensis
Pinus patula
Pinus pinea
Pinus sabiniana
Pinus torreyana
Platanus orientalis var. digitata
Platanus orientalis × chilensis
Platanus orientalis
Populus deltoides
Populus yunnanensis
Quercus acutissima
Quercus douglasii
Quercus engelmannii
Quercus liex
Quercus palustris Pringreen Green Pillar
Quercus phellos
Quercus robur Fastigiata
Quercus rubra
Quercus suber
Quillaja saponaria
Taxodium distichum
Zelkova serrata
Zelkova serrata Green Vase
Zelkova serrata Musashino

Lichens

Endemic lichens of the ACT
Australian Capital Territory has 384 known species of lichens of which 8 are endemic. Study continues on these life forms, so more will be discovered.

The following are found in the ACT, but not in other parts of Australia, those in bold are endemic to the ACT. Those not in bold are found in other parts of the world, but not elsewhere in Australia.

Buellia molonglo (U.Grube & Elix)
Lecanora placodiolica (Lumbsch & Elix)
Malcolmiella cinereovirens Vezda var. isidiata (Vezda),
Pyrrhospora arandensis (Elix)
Xanthoparmelia hyposalazinica (Elix)
Xanthoparmelia paraparmeliformis (Elix)
Xanthoparmelia parasitica (Elix)
Xanthoparmelia subluminosa (Hale)
Collema fragrans
Fellhanera parvula
Fuscopannaria granulans
Lepraria caesioalba (de Lesd.)
Micarea denigrata (Fr.)
Peltigera dilacerata (Gyeln.)

Common lichens in the ACT
(Note: The lichens here are not endemic to the ACT.)

Chrysothrix candellaris - yellow crustose lichen on wood

Ramboldia petraeoides crustose form on stone

Flavoparmelia rutidota is a green foliose lichen found on wood and rocks.

Thamnolia vermicularis is found in high parts of Namadgi National Park - and polar regions (not in ACT).

Rhizocarpon geographicum (map lichen)

List of ACT Lichens

Acarospora citrina
Amygdalaria pelobotryon
Austrella arachnoidea
Bacidina apiahica
Baeomyces heteromorphus
Bapalmuia buchananii
B. georgei
B. molonglo
B. pruinosa
B. substellulans
C. adspersum
C. aggregata
Candelaria concolor
Carbonea montevidensis
C. aurella
C. bimberiensis
C. capitellata
C. capitellata
C. capitellata
C. celata
C. cervicornis
C. chlorophaea
C. cinnabarina
C. corallaizon
C. corniculata
C. corrugativa
C. durietzii
C. enantia
C. erythrosticta
Cetraria australiensis
C. fimbriata
C. flaccidum
C. floerkeana
C. fragrans
C. furcata
C. glebosa
Ch. brunneola
Ch. chlorella
Ch. debilis
C. homosekikaica
Ch. pusilla
Chrysothrix candelaris
Ch. trichialis
C. humilis
C. humilis
C. hyperelloides
C. imbricata
C. inflata
C. krempelhuberi
C. laeve
Clauzadeana macula
C. leucocarpum
C. macilenta
C. merochlorophaea
C. norpruinata
C. nudicaulis
Coccocarpia palmicola
C. ochrochlora
C. paeminosa
C. pertricosa
C. pleurota
C. pruinata
C. pyxidata
C. quadriloculare
C. ramulosa
C. retipora
C. rigida
C. rigida
C. salicinum
C. sarmentosa
C. scabriuscula
C. schizopora
C. staufferi
C. subcariosa
C. subflaccidum
C. subradiata
C. subsquamosa
C. sulcata
C. tenerrima
C. tessellata
C. trabinellum
C. tricolor
C. victorianum
C. vitellina
C. xanthostigma
C. xanthostigmoides
Cyphelium trachylioides
D. euganeus
D. gyrophoricus
Dibaeis arcuata
Diplotomma canescens
Dirinaria applanata
D. muscorum
D. scruposus
D. thunbergianus
E. helmsianum
E. pusillum
F. crustata
F. decipiens
Fellhanera parvula
F. granulans
F. haysomii
F. rutidota
F. springtonensis
F. subimmixta
Fuscidea australis
Halecania australis
H. australis
H. beaugleholei
H. billardierei
H. enteromorphoides
Hertelidea pseudobotryosa
H. foveata
H. friesii
H. immaculata
H. kosciuskoensis
H. lugubris
H. muelleri
H. mundata
H. procellarum
H. pulverata
H. revoluta
H. scalaris
H. subphysodes
H. subphysodes
H. tetrapla
H. tubularis
H. turgidula
Hyperphyscia adglutinata
Immersaria athroocarpa
Imshaugia aleurites
L. atlantica
L. atromorio
L. bicincta
L. caesioalba
L. caesiorubella
L. capensis
L. contigua
L. crassilabra
L. demersa
L. dispersa
L. elaeochroma
L. epibryon
L. epibryon
Leprocaulon microscopicum
Leptogium coralloideum
L. farinacea
L. flavidomarginata
L. fuscoatrula
L. galactiniza
L. intricata
L. isidiophora
L. jackii
L. lapicida
L. lobificans
L. lugubris
L. ochroleuca
L. oreinoides
L. placodiolica
L. planaica
L. pseudistera
L. pseudogangaleoides
L. scrobiculata
L. stigmatea
L. sublapicida
L. swartzii
L. vouauxii
M. aeneofusca
Malcolmiella cinereovirens
M. assimilata
M. australis
M. denigrata
Melanelia piliferella
M. hypnorum
M. nothofagi
M. platytrema
Neophyllis melacarpa
Normandina pulchella
O. africana
O. pallescens
Orphniospora moriopsis
P. adscendens
P. afrorevoluta
P. angustata
Pannaria elixii
P. arandensis
Parmeliopsis ambigua
P. borreri
P. chinense
P. clavuliferum
P. conlabrosa
P. contraponenda
P. crocata
P. crustulata
P. desfontainii
P. didactyla
P. dilacerata
P. dolichorrhiza
P. elliptica
Peltula euploca
P. endoleuca
P. erumpens
P. gibberosa
P. glauca
P. haitiense
P. hispidula
P. jackii
P. labrosa
Placopsis perrugosa
Placynthiella icmalea
P. laeta
P. leptocarpa
P. leucothelia
P. lophocarpa
P. neglecta
P. nigrum
P. nubila
Poeltiaria corralensis
P. orbicularis
P. poncinsii
P. protosignifera
P. pseudocoralloidea
P. pseudorelicina
P. pseudotenuirima
P. reticulatum
Protoparmelia badia
Pseudephebe pubescens
P. signifera
Psilolechia lucida
P. speirea
P. subalbicans
P. subfatiscens
P. subradiatum
P. subrudecta
P. subtinctorium
P. subventosa
P. sulcata
P. tenuirima
P. tribacia
P. wilsonii
R. asperata
R. disporum
R. geographicum
Relicina subnigra
R. exigua
R. fimbriata
R. glaucescens
R. inflata
R. insularis
R. murrayi
R. obscuratum
R. occulta
R. oxydata
R. petraeoides
R. plicatula
R. psephota
R. pyrina
R. stuartii
R. subnexa
R. thiomela
R. tinei
R. unilateralis
Sarcogyne regularis
Schaereria fuscocinerea
S. corticatulum
S. ramulosum
T. atra
T. chrysophthalmus
T. fasciculatus
Thamnolia vermicularis
Th.hookeri
Th. scutellatum
Toninia bullata
Trapelia coarctata
Trapeliopsis granulosa
Tremolecia atrata
T. sieberianus
T. sorediata
T. velifer
Tylothallia pahiensis
U. cylindrica
U. hirsuta
U. hyperborea
U. inermis
U. maculata
U. molliuscula
U. polyphylla
U. rubicunda
U. scabrida
U. subalpina
U. subglabra
U. torulosa
V. baldensis
V. hydrela
V. nigrescens
X. amplexula
X. mexicana
X. scabrosa
X. arapilensis
X. atrocapnodes
X. australasica
X. austroalpina
X. barbatica
X. barbellata
X. bicontinens
X. burmeisteri
X. cheelii
X. congensis
X. congesta
X. consociata
X. cordillerana
X. delisei
X. delisiella
X. dichotoma
X. digitiformis
X. dissitifolia
X. elaeodes
X. elixii
X. exillima
X. filarszkyana
X. flavescentireagens
X. franklinensis
X. furcata
X. glabrans
X. glareosa
X. hypoprotocetrarica
X. hyposalazinica
X. iniquita
X. isidiigera
X. ligulata
X. lineola
X. lithophiloides
X. loxodella
X. luminosa
X. luteonotata
X. masonii
X. metaclystoides
X. metamorphosa
X. microcephala
X. mougeotina
X. murina
X. nebulosa
X. neorimalis
X. neotinctina
X. nigrocephala
X. norcapnodes
X. notata
X. oleosa
X. paraparmeliformis
X. parasitica
X. parviloba
X. pertinax
X. pseudohypoleia
X. pulla
X. pustuliza
X. reptans
X. rubrireagens
X. rupestris
X. scotophylla
X. semiviridis
X. spodochroa
X. squamariatella
X. stygiodes
X. subcrustacea
X. subincerta
X. subluminosa
X. subnuda
X. subprolixa
X. substrigosa
X. taractica
X. tasmanica
X. tegeta
X. thamnoides
X. trirosea
X. ustulata
X. verisidiosa
X. verrucella
X. xanthofarinosa
X. xanthomelaena

References

External links
Census of the Flora of the Australian Capital Territory